Fort Kent is a census-designated place (CDP) that comprises the main village in the town of Fort Kent in Aroostook County, Maine. In 2010 Fort Kent's population was 2,488 of 4,097 for the entire town.

Geography
The Fort Kent CDP is located at  (47.254945, −68.585421), along the Saint John River, which forms the northern border of the town as well as the Canada–United States border. The northern terminus of U.S. Route 1 is near the center of the CDP, at the bridge across the Saint John River into Clair, New Brunswick. Maine State Route 161 and Maine State Route 11 intersect Route 1 within the CDP.

The CDP is located at the confluence of the Fish River with the Saint John River.

Demographics

As of the census of 2000, there were 1,979 people, 894 households, and 455 families residing in the CDP. The racial makeup of the CDP was 97.07% White, 0.51% Black or African American, 0.61% Native American, 0.96% Asian, 0.10% from other races, and 0.76% from two or more races. Hispanic or Latino of any race were 0.61% of the population.

There were 894 households, out of which 19.8% had children under the age of 18 living with them, 42.8% were married couples living together, 5.8% had a female householder with no husband present, and 49.1% were non-families. 40.6% of all households were made up of individuals, and 20.4% had someone living alone who was 65 years of age or older. The average household size was 2.03 and the average family size was 2.76.

In the CDP, the population was spread out, with 16.8% under the age of 18, 15.6% from 18 to 24, 23.4% from 25 to 44, 21.8% from 45 to 64, and 22.4% who were 65 years of age or older. The median age was 41 years. For every 100 females, there were 88.2 males. For every 100 females age 18 and over, there were 86.5 males.

The median income for a household in the CDP was $20,914, and the median income for a family was $36,250. Males had a median income of $38,333 versus $18,092 for females. The per capita income for the CDP was $13,882. About 12.8% of families and 22.7% of the population were below the poverty line, including 25.0% of those under age 18 and 20.2% of those age 65 or over.

References

Census-designated places in Maine
Census-designated places in Aroostook County, Maine